Rizvan Gadzhiev (born 6 January 1987 in Makhachkala, Dagestan ASSR) is a freestyle wrestler from Belarus. He participated in Men's freestyle 55 kg at 2008 Summer Olympics. He lost in 1/8 (after beating Maikel Perez in 1/16 of final) with Dilshod Mansurov from Uzbekistan.

Gadzhiev won a bronze medal on 2007 FILA Wrestling World Championships and silver one on 2008 European Wrestling Championships.

External links
 Athlete bio on beijing2008.com

Living people
1987 births
Olympic wrestlers of Belarus
Wrestlers at the 2008 Summer Olympics
Belarusian male sport wrestlers
Belarusian people of Dagestani descent
Sportspeople from Makhachkala
World Wrestling Championships medalists
European Wrestling Championships medalists
21st-century Belarusian people